Batschka-Torontal District ( or Бачко-торонталски округ; ; ;) was one of two original administrative districts of the Voivodeship of Serbia and Banat of Temeschwar (a crown land within Austrian Empire). It existed from 1849 to 1850.

History
The crown land Voivodeship of Serbia and Banat of Temeschwar was formed in 1849 and was initially divided into two districts: Batschka-Torontal and Temeschwar-Karasch. 

In 1850, crown land was divided into five districts and the territory of Batschka-Torontal District was divided among Neusatz District, Zombor District and Großbetschkerek District.

Geography
The Batschka-Torontal District included most of Bačka (excluding Šajkaška region), north-western Banat and northern Syrmia. It shared borders with Temeschwar-Karasch District in the east, Austrian Military Frontier in the south, Austrian Kingdom of Slavonia in the west, and Austrian Kingdom of Hungary in the north-west.

Demographics
According to 1850 census, the population of the district numbered 1,002,013 residents, including:
Germans = 276,552 (27.6%)
Serbs = 264,547 (26.4%)
Hungarians = 251,247 (25.07%)

Cities and towns
Main cities and towns in the district were:
Abthausen (Apatin)
Alt Betsche (Stari Bečej)
Frankenstadt (Baja)
Futok (Futog)
Großbetschkerek (Veliki Bečkerek)
Großkikinda (Velika Kikinda)
India (Inđija)
Josephsfeld (Kula)
Maria-Theresiopel (Subotica)
Neusatz (Novi Sad)
Plankenburg (Palanka)
Ruma (Ruma)
Temeri (Temerin)
Zenta (Senta)
Zombor (Sombor)

Most of the mentioned cities and towns are today in Serbia, while town of Frankenstadt (Baja) is today in Hungary.

References

Further reading
Dr Saša Kicošev - Dr Drago Njegovan, Razvoj etničke i verske strukture Vojvodine, Novi Sad, 2010.
Dr Drago Njegovan, Prisajedinjenje Vojvodine Srbiji, Novi Sad, 2004.

See also
Bačka
Torontal
Voivodeship of Serbia and Banat of Temeschwar

 

History of Bačka
History of Banat
Voivodeship of Serbia and Banat of Temeschwar